The 1985 Mercantile Credit Classic was the sixth edition of the professional snooker tournament with qualifiers taking place in late 1984 with the main stages taking place from 4–13 January 1985. The tournament was played at the Spectrum Arena, Warrington, Cheshire. The event was extended from 8 days to 10, with the semi-final stage and the final both being extended to two days. Television coverage was shared by ITV and Channel 4.

Willie Thorne beat Steve Davis 9–8 in the first semi-final on the Thursday. Davis led 7–5 before Thorne won the next three frames to lead 8–7. Davis won the 16th frame to level the match but Thorne won the deciding frame after taking an early 62–0 lead. It was Thorne's first win over Davis. Thorne made a break of 120 in the fourth frame of the afternoon session, which eventually won him £4,000 for the highest break in the televised stage of the event.

In the second semi-final on the Friday, Cliff Thorburn beat Joe Johnson. Johnson won the second frame to level the match but Thornburn then ran away with the match winning 9–2.

Willie Thorne won his only ranking title beating Cliff Thorburn 13–8. The final was played in three sessions finishing on Sunday afternoon. Thorburn led 4–3 after the first session. Thorne won the first three frames in the evening session to lead 6–4 and finished the day with an 8–7 lead. There were three centuries in the session, 105 and 118 by Thorne and 100 by Thorburn. Thorburn levelled the match at 8–8 by winning the first frame on the Sunday but Thorne then won five frame in a row to win the match and the first prize of £40,000.

Main draw

Final

Qualifying
The last-32 round was played in Warrington in December 1984.

Last-32 round

Century breaks
(Including qualifying rounds)

137  Terry Griffiths
129  Marcel Gauvreau
120, 118, 105, 100  Willie Thorne
118  Bill Werbeniuk
105, 100  Cliff Thorburn
104, 102  Steve Davis
104  Joe Johnson
103  Roger Bales

References

Classic (snooker)
Classic
Classic
Classic
Sport in Warrington